Geraldo José da Silva Filho (born December 31, 1979 in Recife), or simply Parral,  is a Brazilian right back who plays for Serra Talhada.

Honours
Paraná State League: 2006

External links

Brazilian footballers
Clube Náutico Capibaribe players
Sport Club do Recife players
Esporte Clube Vitória players
Sport Club Internacional players
Guarani FC players
Paraná Clube players
Santa Cruz Futebol Clube players
SC Fortuna Köln players
Expatriate footballers in Germany
Association football defenders
1979 births
Living people
Sportspeople from Recife